The Roman Catholic Diocese of Zhengding/Chengting is a diocese located in the city of Zhengding in the Ecclesiastical province of Beijing in China.

History
 April 2, 1856: Established as Apostolic Vicariate of Southwestern Chi-Li 直隸西南 from the Diocese of Beijing 北京
 December 3, 1924: Renamed as Apostolic Vicariate of Zhengdingfu 正定府
 April 11, 1946: Promoted as Diocese of Zhengding 正定

Special churches
Former Cathedral:
正定主教座堂

Leadership

 Vicars Apostolic of Southwestern Chi-Li 直隸西南 (Roman Rite)
 Bishop Jean-Baptiste Anouilh, C.M. (December 14, 1858 – February 18, 1869)
 Bishop François-Ferdinand Tagliabue, C.M. (June 22, 1869 – August 5, 1884)
 Bishop Jean-Baptiste-Hippolyte Sarthou, C.M. (January 16, 1885 – June 6, 1890)
 Bishop Jules Bruguière, C.M. (July 28, 1891 – October 19, 1906)
 Bishop Jules-Auguste Coqset, C.M. (May 3, 1907 – February 4, 1917)
 Bishop Jean de Vienne de Hautefeuille, C.M. (February 4, 1917 – April 2, 1919)
 Vicars Apostolic of Zhengdingfu 正定府 (Roman Rite)
 Bishop Franciscus Hubertus Schraven, C.M. (December 16, 1920 – October 10, 1937)
 Bishop Giobbe Chen Chi-ming, C.M. (January 5, 1939 – April 11, 1946)
 Bishops of Zhengding (Roman rite)
 Bishop Giobbe Chen Chi-ming, C.M. (April 11, 1946 – June 10, 1959)
 Bishop Giulio Jia Zhiguo, present-day underground bishop

References

Roman Catholic dioceses in China
Religious organizations established in 1856
Roman Catholic dioceses and prelatures established in the 19th century
1856 establishments in China
Christianity in Hebei